Edgar Selge (born 27 March 1948) is a German actor and writer.
Selge was born in Brilon in 1949, the son of a prison warden, grew up in Herford. He studied philosophy and German in Munich and Dublin as well as classical piano in Vienna. He graduated in 1975 from the Otto Falckenberg School of the Performing Arts in Munich.

Launched in October 2021, his first book, the autobiographical "Hast du uns endlich gefunden" became a bestseller on the German language book market.

Selected filmography

References

External links
 

1948 births
Living people
People from Herford
German male film actors
German male television actors
20th-century German male actors
21st-century German male actors